Hammam Bou Hadjar is a town in northwestern Algeria.

References 

Communes of Aïn Témouchent Province
Aïn Témouchent Province